Coldham railway station was a station in Coldham, Cambridgeshire. It was on the branch of the Great Eastern Railway which ran from March to Watlington, Norfolk. The station opened in 1847, and in 1894 a porter was killed in an accident there.

The station closed in 1966, the line closed for passengers in 1968 and for freight in 2000. Nothing remains of the former station, with the exception of the former toilet block, which is concealed by undergrowth which has built up since the station closed.

A plan by the Bramley Line to restore the line between Wisbech and March may see trains return to Coldham in some form.

References

Disused railway stations in Cambridgeshire
Former Great Eastern Railway stations
Railway stations in Great Britain opened in 1847
Railway stations in Great Britain closed in 1966
1847 establishments in England